Inkster was a provincial electoral division in the Canadian province of Manitoba. It was located in the northwestern corner of the city of Winnipeg. Officially created by redistribution in 1957, it has existed since the provincial election of 1958.

The riding was named after the Inkster family, who were prominent local figures at the time of the province's creation in 1870.  John Inkster was a member of Louis Riel's provisional government, while Colin Inkster was a member of the province's Legislative Council (which existed from 1871 to 1876).

There were 19,246 persons living in the riding in 1996. Inkster had a broad range of income levels and a strong working-class presence (the manufacturing sector accounting for 23% of industry in 1999). Census reports from 1999 showed an average family income of $51,274, with 8.10% unemployment.

Inkster had the third-largest immigrant population of all ridings in the province, at over 30% of the total population. 21% of the riding's residents are Filipino, 6% are Ukrainian, and 5% are East Indian. Only 4% of the population is above age 65.

Like many other north-end Winnipeg ridings, Inkster traditionally supported the New Democratic Party and its predecessor, the Cooperative Commonwealth Federation, although Liberal Kevin Lamoureux represented the riding for all but four years from 1988 to 2010. For the 2011 election, Inkster was dissolved into The Maples and the new riding of Tyndall Park.

List of provincial representatives

Electoral history

References

Former provincial electoral districts of Manitoba
Politics of Winnipeg